Pauline Eckles Young ( Vinson, June 23, 1915 – June 22, 1986) was an American artist and illustrator.

Vinson was born on June 23, 1915, in Orange, California. She lived in San Francisco before moving to New York City to work as a book illustrator. While in San Francisco, she did a series of lithographs for the Works Progress Administration.

Her work is included in the collections of the Smithsonian American Art Museum, the National Gallery of Art, Washington the Fine Arts Museums of San Francisco. Vinson's married surname was Young. She died in Santa Clara on June 22, 1986, at the age of 70.

Books
Willie Goes to the Hospital
Festivals in San Francisco, 1939, illustrator
Around the World in San Francisco, 1940, illustrator
Hilltop Russians in San Francisco, 1941, illustrator

References

1915 births
1986 deaths
20th-century American women artists
American illustrators
Artists from San Francisco
Federal Art Project artists